Colette Langlade (born 20 June 1956) was a member of the National Assembly of France.  She represented Dordogne's 3rd constituency from 2008 to 2017, and is a member of the Socialiste, radical, citoyen et divers gauche.

Biography

Parliamentary activity

Summary of mandates

References

1956 births
Living people
Socialist Party (France) politicians
Women members of the National Assembly (France)
Deputies of the 14th National Assembly of the French Fifth Republic
21st-century French women politicians